Strandiata monikae is a species of beetle in the family Cerambycidae. It was described by Adlbauer in 2008. It is known from Ethiopia.

References

Endemic fauna of Ethiopia
Phrissomini
Beetles described in 2008